Lawrence Varsi Castner (May 1, 1902 – December 7, 1949) was an American businessman, fencer and military officer. He competed in the individual and team sabre events at the 1924 Summer Olympics.  His greatest acclaim came during World War II, when he led a unit known as Castner's Cutthroats in Alaska.

Biography
Lawrence V. Castner was born in San Francisco on May 1, 1902. He graduated from the United States Military Academy at West Point in 1923.

For his service in Alaska, he earned the Distinguished Service Medal and the Legion of Merit.

He died at his mother's home in Oakland, California on December 7, 1949, after a long illness, and was buried at San Francisco National Cemetery.

References

External links
 

1902 births
1949 deaths
American male sabre fencers
United States Army personnel of World War II
Fencers at the 1924 Summer Olympics
Olympic fencers of the United States
Sportspeople from Anchorage, Alaska
Fencers from San Francisco
United States Army colonels
Businesspeople from Anchorage, Alaska
Military personnel from Anchorage, Alaska
20th-century American businesspeople
Recipients of the Distinguished Service Medal (US Army)
Recipients of the Legion of Merit
Burials at San Francisco National Cemetery